Curic, Ćurić,  Čurić, or Curić is a South Slavic surname. Notable people with the surname include:

Edin Ćurić, Bosnian football player
Ivan Ćurić (disambiguation), multiple people
Ivan Ćurić (bishop) (born 1964), Croatian Roman Catholic prelate
Ivan Ćurić (footballer) (born 1987), Croatian footballer
Kemal Curić, Bosnian automobile designer
Vjekoslav Ćurić, Bosnian Croat priest and humanitarian

See also

South Slavic-language surnames